Melanoseps is a genus of lizards, known commonly as limbless skinks, in the family Scincidae. The genus is endemic to Sub-Saharan Africa.

Species
The following eight species are recognized as being valid.
Melanoseps ater  – black limbless skink.
Melanoseps emmrichi  – Uluguru limbless skink. 
Melanoseps longicauda  – Pangani black limbless skink, longtail limbless skink
Melanoseps loveridgei   – Loveridge's limbless skink
Melanoseps occidentalis   – western limbless skink
Melanoseps pygmaeus   – pygmy limbless skink
Melanoseps rondoensis   – Rondo limbless skink
Melanoseps uzungwensis   – Udzungwa limbless skink

Nota bene: A binomial authority in parentheses indicates that the species was originally described in a genus other than Melanoseps.

References

Further reading
Boulenger GA (1887). Catalogue of the Lizards in the British Museum (Natural History). Second Edition. Volume III. ... Scincidæ ... London: Trustees of the British Museum (Natural History). (Taylor and Francis, printers). xii + 575 pp. + Plates I-XL. (Melanoseps, new genus, p. 422).

Melanoseps
Lizard genera
Taxa named by George Albert Boulenger